Clay is a material primarily composed of a grouping of clay minerals, and can be used as an art medium.

Clay may also refer to:

Places

United States
Clay, Alabama, a city
Clay, California, a census-designated place
Clay, Kentucky, a home rule-class city
Clay, Missouri, an unincorporated community
Clay, New York, a town
Clay, Ohio, an unincorporated community
Clay, Texas, a census-designated place 
Clay, West Virginia, a town
Clay, Wisconsin, a ghost town
Clay Center (disambiguation)
Clay County (disambiguation)
Clay Township (disambiguation)
Mount Clay, a peak in New Hampshire

Elsewhere
Clay, a townland in County Armagh, Northern Ireland
Clay, a townland in County Down, Northern Ireland
Clay, a townland in County Fermanagh, Northern Ireland
Clay Island, Nunavut, Canada

People and fictional characters with the name
Clay (name), a list of people and fictional characters with the given name or surname

Arts, entertainment, and media

Films
Clay (1965 film), an Australian film
Clay (2008 film), based on the novel by David Almond
Clay (Clowns Laughing At You), a hacker group in Who Am I

Literature
Clay (novel), by David Almond
"Clay" (short story), by James Joyce

Music
"Clay", a song by Grace VanderWaal from Perfectly Imperfect
Clay Records, a record label
"Clay", a song by Goldfrapp from Tales of Us

Other uses
Clay (musical), a 2008 hip hop musical by Matt Sax
"Clay", an episode of the television series Teletubbies
 Modelling clay

Science and technology
Clay (industrial plasticine)
Clay Mathematics Institute, a private, non-profit foundation, based in Providence, Rhode Island
Clay moths, several relatively unrelated species (although most are of family Noctuidae):
Cyclophora linearia (clay triple-lines, family Geometridae)
Eugnorisma depuncta (plain clay) and several Diarsia and Xestia species (Noctuinae)
Mythimna ferrago (the clay, Hadeninae)
Paracolax tristalis (clay fan-foot, Herminiinae)

Other uses
Clay court, a type of tennis court
Hair clay, a type of hair product
Medicinal clay

See also

Clay City (disambiguation)
Claye (disambiguation)
Claysburg (disambiguation)
Claysville (disambiguation)
Klay (disambiguation)